Rissopsetia gracilis is a species of sea snail, a marine gastropod mollusk in the family Pyramidellidae, the pyrams and their allies.

Taxonomy
Tentatively assigned to Rissopsetia by Ponder (1974); does not belong to Epigrus (Rissooidea).

Distribution
This marine species is endemic to New Zealand.

References

 Oliver, W. R. B. "The mollusca of the Kermadec Islands." Transactions and Proceedings of the New Zealand Institute. Vol. 47. 1915.
 Ponder W. 1974. A review of the Australian species assigned to Rissopsis Garrett with a description of a new species of Rissopsetia (Mollusca: Gastropoda). Journal of the Malacological Society of Australia, 3: 25-35

External links
 To World Register of Marine Species
 Spencer H.G., Willan R.C., Marshall B.A. & Murray T.J. (2011) Checklist of the Recent Mollusca Recorded from the New Zealand Exclusive Economic Zone

Pyramidellidae
Gastropods described in 1915
Gastropods of New Zealand